LA 9, LA-9, La-9, LA9 or La9 may refer to:

 Lavochkin La-9, a Cold War-era Soviet fighter aircraft
 Louisiana Highway 9, a north–south road in northern Louisiana
 Louisiana's 9th State Senate district, a state senate district representing the Jefferson Parish city of Metairie, and incorporating smaller parts of Jefferson and Uptown New Orleans
 Louisiana's 9th House of Representatives district, a district in the Louisiana House of Representatives representing parts of Bossier Parish
 Los Angeles City Council District 9, representing much of South Los Angeles and the western section of Downtown Los Angeles
 Constituency LA-9, a constituency of the Azad Jammu and Kashmir Legislative Assembly in Pakistan